The Ottawa Titans Baseball Club (French: Les Titans d'Ottawa) is a professional baseball team based in Ottawa, Ontario, Canada. The Titans made their debut in 2022 as a member of the independent Frontier League, which is an official MLB Partner League. They played their home games at Ottawa Stadium. The Titans mascot is Cappy. They became the city's seventh professional baseball franchise succeeding the International League's Ottawa Giants, Ottawa Athletics and Ottawa Lynx, the Can-Am League's Ottawa Rapidz and Ottawa Champions and the Intercounty Baseball League's Ottawa Fat Cats.

History

Founding and Covid impact 
After the 2019 season, the Can-Am League merged with the Frontier League and five of the six teams remaining in it joined the latter league. The Champions were not invited to take part, but it was not immediately clear if they would fold or go on hiatus as owner Miles Wolff, the former Can-Am League commissioner, looked to sell the team. He could not find a buyer, however, and the team folded operations. Eventually, the Frontier League decided to expand to Ottawa anyway, announcing in September 2020 that the league would be granting a franchise to a group led by Sam Katz, the former mayor of Winnipeg and owner of the Winnipeg Goldeyes of the American Association of Professional Baseball, and Ottawa Sports and Entertainment Group, who owns the Ottawa 67’s junior hockey team and the Ottawa Redblacks of the Canadian Football League; the league considers this to be an expansion team and not to have any connection to the Champions.

On 6 October 2020, Ottawa announced Steve Brook as the team's inaugural manager. Brook previously managed the River City Rascals in the Frontier League from 2010 to 2019. He led the Rascals to a 488–373 record over his nine seasons at the helm including the 2010 and 2019 championships. In December 2020, Ottawa announced the team name as Ottawa Titans a result of a name-the-team contest, and the team colors in the tradition of Ottawa sports franchises such as the Ottawa Redblacks, Ottawa 67's, and Ottawa Senators.

On 22 April 2021, the Frontier League announced that Ottawa (along with the Trois-Rivières Aigles) would not compete in the 2021 season due to the prolonged closure of the Canada–United States border as a result of the ongoing COVID-19 pandemic in Ottawa. Canadian players signed by the Titans and the Aigles had the opportunity to join the Québec Capitales (who started the season as a traveling team known as Équipe Québec, playing exclusively in the U.S.), while non-Canadian players were subject to a dispersal draft among the 13 U.S.–based teams. The Titans intended on returning to competition for their inaugural season in 2022.

Early seasons 
In October 2021, Bobby Brown was hired as the Titans manager for the 2022 season, after Steve Brook, on a one-year contract, decided to move on. The Titans played their first home game on 24 May 2022 against the Evansville Otters in front of a crowd of 3,458. On 11 June 2022, outfielder Jacob Sanford tied the Frontier League record with 10 RBI in a single game in a 13-0 victory over the Empire State Greys. On 3 September 2022, the Titans clinched their playoff spot for the first time in franchise history. In the wild card game, the Titans defeated the New York Boulders 8-2 to advance to the divisional round against the Québec Capitales. However, they lost to the Capitales 2 games to 1 in the divisional round.  In their first season in Ottawa, The Titans averaged 2,210 fans per game for a total of 112,727 in 51 home games.

Season-by-season records

Attendance

Ottawa Stadium 

Since 2022, the Titans play their home games at the 10,332-seat Ottawa Stadium just east of downtown Ottawa. Ottawa Stadium has a pedestrian bridge to help make it easier to get to the ballpark using OC Transpo's light rail system. The pedestrian bridge crosses over Highway 417 to connect the ballpark to the Transit Way and is named in honour of the late Max Keeping.

Current roster

References

External links
 

Frontier League teams
Baseball teams in Ottawa
Baseball teams established in 2020
2020 establishments in Ontario